A by-election was held for the New South Wales Legislative Assembly electorate of Orange on 14 February 1976. The election was triggered by the retirement of Sir Charles Cutler.

Dates

Results

Sir Charles Cutler resigned.

See also
Electoral results for the district of Orange
List of New South Wales state by-elections

References 

1976 elections in Australia
New South Wales state by-elections
1970s in New South Wales
February 1976 events in Australia